Margarita Ganeva (born 1959, in Sofia) was the Bulgarian Ambassador to Slovakia.  She presented her credentials to Deputy Prime Minister and Minister of Foreign Affairs of the Slovak Republic Miroslav Lajčák on April 25, 2012.

Ganeva graduated with a degree in economics from the Economic University in Prague.

References

1959 births
Living people
Diplomats from Sofia
Bulgarian women ambassadors
Ambassadors of Bulgaria to Slovakia